The Floating ecopolis, otherwise known as the Lilypad, is a model designed by Belgian architect Vincent Callebaut for future climatic refugees. He proposed this model as a long-term solution to rising water level as per the GIEC (Intergovernmental group on the evolution of the climate)  forecast. It is a self-sufficient amphibious city and satisfies the four challenges laid down by the OECD (Organisation for Economic Co-operation and Development) in March 2008 namely, climate, biodiversity, water and health.

Architect 

Vincent Callebaut is a Belgian architect known for his eco-friendly projects. He has received many awards. Some of the recent ones include:

 First Prize Winner in Taipei, Taiwan, for his Luxurious Residential Tower (2010) 
 First Prize Winner in Royat, France for his Thermal Swimming Pool (2009)

Design 

The floating structure has a capacity to shelter 50,000 individuals. It consists of three marinas and three "mountains", which are meant for entertainment purposes, surrounding a centrally located artificial lagoon that performs the task of collecting and purifying water. The shape of this floating structure was inspired from the highly ribbed leaf of the Amazonia Victoria Regia water lily. The double skin of this structure would be made of polyester fibers covered by a layer of titanium dioxide (TiO2). The titanium oxide  reacts with ultraviolet rays and therefore, due to  photocatalytic effect, it absorbs atmospheric pollution in the process.

Energy 

By only using renewable energies, this design has zero carbon emission and it produces more energy than it consumes. Energy sources could include:

 Biomass
 Osmotic power
 Phytopurification
 Solar thermal
 Solar photovoltaic
 Tidal power
 Wind energy

See also 

 Seasteading
 Vertical farm

References

External links 

 
 
 
 

Planned cities
Seasteading
Emerging technologies
Belgian inventions